Marjorie Perloff (born September 28, 1931) is an Austrian-born poetry scholar and critic in the United States.

Early life
Perloff was born Gabriele Mintz into a secularized Jewish family in Vienna. The annexation of Austria by Nazi Germany exacerbated Viennese anti-Semitism, and so the family  emigrated in 1938, when she was six-and-a-half, going first to Zürich and then to the United States, settling in Riverdale, New York. After attending Oberlin College from 1949 to 1952, she graduated magna cum laude and Phi Beta Kappa from Barnard College in 1953; that year, she married Joseph K. Perloff, a cardiologist focused on congenital heart disease. She completed her graduate work at the Catholic University of America in Washington, D.C., earning an M.A. in 1956 and a Ph.D (with a dissertation on W.B. Yeats) in 1965.

Career
Perloff taught at Catholic University from 1966 to 1971. She then moved on to become Professor of English at the University of Maryland, College Park (1971–1976) and Professor of English and Comparative Literature at the University of Southern California (1976–1986) and Stanford University (1986–1990). Her position was endowed as the  Sadie Dernham Patek Professor of Humanities at Stanford (1990—2000; emerita from 2001). She is currently scholar-in-residence and Florence Scott Professor of English Emerita at the University of Southern California.

Her work has been especially concerned with explicating the writing of experimental and avant-garde poets and relating it to the major currents of modernist and, especially, postmodernist activity in the arts, including the visual arts and literary theory.

The first three books published by Perloff each focused on different poets: Yeats, Robert Lowell, and Frank O'Hara respectively. In 1981, she changed directions with The Poetics of Indeterminacy, which began her work on avant-gardist poetry, paving the way for The Futurist Moment: Avant-Garde, Avant-Guerre, and the Language of Rupture in 1986 and many subsequent titles. Differentials: Poetry, Poetics, Pedagogy, published in 2004, won the Robert Penn Warren Prize in 2005 as well as Honorable Mention for the Robert Motherwell Prize of the Dedalus Foundation.

Perloff has done much to promote poetics that are not normally part of the discourse in the United States such as works of Louis Zukofsky, Kenneth Goldsmith, or Brazilian poetry. She is credited with coining the term — "unoriginal genius" — to reflect on the changing nature of literary writing including poetry in the Internet age after artistic originality and creativity were allegedly replaced by the ability to pass along information. Her work on contemporary American poetry, and in particular poetry associated with Language poetry and the Objectivist poets), posits and critiques an "Official Verse Culture" that determines what is and is not worthy of publication, critique and emulation. In 2001 she gave the British Academy's Sarah Tryphena Phillips Lecture in American Literature and History, on Gertrude Stein's Differential Syntax.

In 2008–09, she was the Weidenfeld Visiting Professor of European Comparative Literature in St Anne's College, Oxford. She is also member of the International Jury of the Janus Pannonius Grand Prize for Poetry Foundation (an award of the Hungarian PEN Club).

Bibliography

Selected works
 
 Poetics in a New Key: Interviews and Essays (University of Chicago Press, 2014)  Read an excerpt. 
 Unoriginal Genius: Poetry by Other Means in the New Century (University of Chicago Press, 2010) . Spanish version: El genio no original: Poesía por otros medios en el nuevo siglo (greylock, 2019) 
 Differentials: Poetry, Poetics, Pedagogy (University of Alabama Press, 2004) 
 The Vienna Paradox: A Memoir (New Directions Books, 2004) 
 The Futurist Moment: Avant-Garde, Avant Guerre, and the Language of Rupture, with a New Preface (University of Chicago Press, 2003) pbk. 
 Poetry On and Off the Page: Essays for Emergent Occasions (Northwestern University Press, 1998) 
 Frank O'Hara: Poet Among Painters (University of Chicago Press, 1998)  (originally published by Braziller, 1977)
 The Dance of the Intellect: Studies in the Poetry of the Pound Tradition (Northwestern University Press, 1996) pbk. 
 Wittgenstein's Ladder: Poetic Language and the Strangeness of the Ordinary (University of Chicago Press, 1996) pbk. 
 Radical Artifice: Writing Poetry in the Age of Media (University of Chicago Press, 1991) 
 Poetic License: Studies in the Modernist and Postmodernist Lyric (Northwestern University Press, 1990)

Critical studies and reviews of Perloff's work
Radical artifice

References

External links
Author Page at EPC 	
Stanford homepage 	
A response to the literary critic Harold Bloom 	
Interview with David Clippinger for The Argotist Online
Interview with Jeffrey Side for The Argotist Online
Audio of Marjorie Perloff's lecture "The Aura of Modernism" delivered at the Walter Chapin Simpson Center for the Humanities on May 19, 2004.
Review of The Vienna Paradox poet Ron Silliman discusses Perloff's memoir on his blog September 12, 2005
Three one-hour radio interviews on Entitled Opinions with Robert P. Harrison about Ezra Pound, W.B. Yeats, and the Avant-Gardes

Living people
1931 births
Barnard College alumni
Oberlin College alumni
American academics of English literature
American literary critics
Women literary critics
Jewish emigrants from Austria to the United States after the Anschluss
Austrian Jews
Catholic University of America alumni
Catholic University of America School of Arts and Sciences faculty
University of Southern California faculty
Stanford University Department of English faculty
University of Maryland, College Park faculty
American women critics
Presidents of the Modern Language Association